Through Gates of Splendor is a 1957 best selling book written by Elisabeth Elliot. The book tells the story of Operation Auca, an attempt by five American missionaries – Jim Elliot (the author's husband), Pete Flemming, Ed McCully, Nate Saint, and Roger Youderian – to reach the Huaorani tribe of eastern Ecuador. All five of the men were killed by the tribe. The book is Elliot's first book, and arguably her most well-known work.

The title of the book is derived from the fourth stanza of the hymn "We Rest on Thee". This hymn was famously sung by the missionaries before the men left for Waodaoni territory in September 1955. The lines read:
We rest on Thee, our Shield, and our Defender.
Thine is the battle, Thine shall be the praise;
When passing through the gates of pearly splendor,
Victors, we rest with Thee, through endless days.

Elliot wrote the book while still a missionary in Ecuador. She wrote the book at the request and with cooperation from the families of the five men. She was given copies of letters, and other writings which were extensively quoted from in the book.  The original edition of the book was published in 1957, one year before the first peaceful contact with the Huaorani was made. In subsequent publications of the book, epilogues have been added to tell about what has happened to the Huaorani tribe since Operation Auca, and what has happened to the missionaries' families.

Films

In 1967, a documentary film of the same name was produced which included much of the film footage shot by Nate Saint at "Palm Beach". Elisabeth Elliot narrated the film. It was based on Through Gates of Splendor as well as her later book, The Savage My Kinsman.

In 2005 a docudrama was produced, End of the Spear. The film recounts the story of Through Gates of Splendor, but from the perspective of Steve Saint (the son of Nate Saint, one of the missionaries killed in the encounter) as well as from Mincavani, one of the tribesmen who took part in the attack. The two eventually form a bond that continues to this day.

See also 
 Beyond the Gates of Splendor

References

External links
 At Amazon.com
 Words & music to “We Rest on Thee” at the Cyber Hymnal

1957 non-fiction books
Books of Christian biography
Books on Christian missions
Operation Auca
Harper & Brothers books
Books by Elisabeth Elliot